Alex Bolt and Max Purcell were the defending champions but only Purcell chose to defend his title, partnering Lloyd Harris. Purcell lost in the semifinals to Joris De Loore and Marc Polmans.

Robert Galloway and Roberto Maytín won the title after defeating De Loore and Polmans 6–3, 6–1 in the final.

Seeds

Draw

References
 Main Draw

Kentucky Bank Tennis Championships - Men's Doubles
2018 Men's Doubles